Vukashin Latinovich (born September 14, 1997) is an American professional soccer player who plays as a defender for Meistriliiga club FCI Levadia Tallinn.

Club career
Born in Brookfield, Wisconsin, Latinovich is the son of Rade, a former Marquette Golden Eagles player, and Biljana, a former professional women's handball player. He began his career with the Milwaukee Kickers before joining the youth academy at FK Brodarac in Serbia. After spending four seasons with Brodarac, Latinovich returned to the United States and began playing college soccer for the Milwaukee Panthers. During his three seasons with the Panthers, Latinovich played in 57 games, scoring 11 goals. While in college, Latinovich also spent a season with USL League Two club Chicago FC United, making his debut on May 28, 2019 against Flint City Bucks. He started and played the whole match as Chicago FC United won 5–0.

New York City FC
On January 21, 2021, Latinovich was selected with the 71st overall pick by New York City FC in the MLS SuperDraft. On April 15, 2021, after impressing during pre-season, Latinovich signed a professional contract with the club.

On May 1, 2021, he made his Major League Soccer debut against the Philadelphia Union, coming on as a late substitute during a 2–0 victory. His contract option was declined on November 15, 2022.

FCI Levadia Tallinn
On January 26, 2023, he signed with FCI Levadia Tallinn in the Meistriliiga, the top flight of Estonian football.

International career
While in Serbia, Latinovich was called up into the Serbia under-18 side.

Career statistics

Honors
New York City FC
MLS Cup: 2021
Campeones Cup: 2022

References

External links
 Profile at New York City FC

1997 births
Living people
People from Brookfield, Wisconsin
Sportspeople from the Milwaukee metropolitan area
American people of Serbian descent
American soccer players
Serbian footballers
Association football defenders
Milwaukee Panthers men's soccer players
Chicago FC United players
New York City FC draft picks
New York City FC players
FCI Levadia Tallinn players
Major League Soccer players
Soccer players from Wisconsin
USL League Two players
New York City FC II players
MLS Next Pro players

American expatriate soccer players
American expatriate sportspeople in Estonia
Expatriate footballers in Estonia